Harry Southall (24 January 1885 – 22 January 1952) was an English first-class cricketer who played a single first-class match for Worcestershire against Lancashire in 1907. He scored 11 in his only innings before being dismissed by Lawrence Cook.

Southall was born in Kingswinford; he died in Pensnett, Staffordshire just two days short of his 67th birthday.

External links 
 

1885 births
1952 deaths
English cricketers
Worcestershire cricketers
People from Kingswinford
Cricketers from the West Midlands